Mary Canfield Ballard (pen name Minnie C. Ballard; June 22, 1852 – September 7, 1927) was an American poet and hymnwriter. She was a prolific contributor to periodicals, contributing occasionally to thirty of them.

Early life and education
Mary Canfield Ballard was born in Troy, Pennsylvania, June 22, 1852. Her parents were 
Orrin Porter Ballard and Eliza Ann Spalding Ballard. On her mother's side, Ballard was related to Colonel Ethan Allen, of Revolutionary fame. Her father was a self-made man and accumulated considerable property in Bradford County, Pennsylvania.

She was sent to the Pennsylvania State Normal School when about fourteen years old, but, growing homesick, she returned to her home in Troy where she finished her education.

Her early literary efforts were very ambitious ones. When she was only thirteen years old, she wrote a continued story about a hair-pin, managing to introduce an elopement, an angry father, tears, repentance and forgiveness. She also wrote an essay on Sappho. She began to write poems at the age of sixteen.

Career
Ballard was the youngest of a large family, but, her brothers and sisters being married and her father and mother dead, she lived alone. 

She was devoted to painting, music and literature and was a prolific contributor to periodicals under the pen name "Minnie C. Ballard" ever since she sent her first poem to William Cullen Bryant, who gave it a place in the Evening Post. Her first published productions made their appearance when she was 21 years old. Since her appearance in the poets' corner of the Evening Post, she contributed occasionally to some thirty periodicals. Ballard published Idle Fancies (Troy, Pa., 1883), for private circulation, and a new edition for the general public (Philadelphia, 1884). She contributed to the Philadelphia Times, The Cincinnati Enquirer, the Louisville Courier-Journal, Godey's Lady's Book, Peterson's Magazine, and the St. Louis Magazine.

She wrote the lyrics for the hymns, "Easter Hymn", first published in The International Lesson Hymnal (Chicago, Illinois: David C. Cook, 1878), number 108., music by E. B. Smith, 1878 and "Shall It Be You or I?".

Death
Ballard died September 7, 1927, and is buried at Saint Johns Cemetery, Troy, Pennsylvania.

Selected works
 ... Idle Fancies, 1884

References

Attribution

External links

 
 

1852 births
1927 deaths
19th-century American poets
19th-century American women writers
19th-century pseudonymous writers
People from Bradford County, Pennsylvania
Poets from Pennsylvania
American women poets
American hymnwriters
American women hymnwriters
Pseudonymous women writers
Wikipedia articles incorporating text from A Woman of the Century